Georgetown Preparatory School (also known as Georgetown Prep) is a Jesuit college-preparatory school in North Bethesda, Maryland for boys in ninth through twelfth grade. It has a 93-acre (380,000 square meters) campus. It is the only Jesuit boarding school in the United States. It is in the district of the Roman Catholic Archdiocese of Washington.

History

Georgetown Preparatory School was founded in 1789 by John Carroll, the first bishop of Baltimore. In 1919, the school moved from Georgetown University's campus in the District of Columbia to its current location, under the direction of university president Alphonsus J. Donlon.  Georgetown Prep remained part of Georgetown University until its legal separation in 1927.

There are approximately 500 students at Prep, with the boarding students comprising 20% of the school’s population (2022–23).

In January 2007, the school opened the Hanley Center for Athletic Excellence. Joe Hills, son of golf course architect Arthur Hills, redesigned and severely shrank the school's golf course, which reopened in 2008. The field house was converted into a learning center, which was named after the immediate past president Fr. William L. George, S.J., opened for students on January 26, 2010.

The Campus Center and Residence Building opened in October 2022, which incorporates a health center.

Athletics 
Georgetown Prep teams are known as the Hoyas and offer 28 team sports. The Hoyas have won 53 Interstate Athletic Conference (IAC) Championships from 2012 to 2022.

Notable alumni

See also

 List of Jesuit sites

References

Further reading

External links 

Catholic secondary schools in Maryland
Catholic boarding schools in the United States
Jesuit high schools in the United States
Educational institutions established in 1789
Boarding schools in Maryland
Boys' schools in Maryland
Former Georgetown University schools
1789 establishments in Maryland
Private high schools in Montgomery County, Maryland
North Bethesda, Maryland